The Brest trolleybus system serves the city of Brest, on the western border of Belarus.

Opened on 18 April 1981, the system had eight lines as at 2011.

Lines 
As at 2011, the system was made up of the following lines:
 1 Ordzhonikidze (railway station) – Regional Hospital;
 2 Sverdlov – SC "Victoria";
 2a Ordzhonikidze – SC "Victoria";
 3 Ordzhonikidze – SC "Victoria";
 4 Ordzhonikidze – CSM;
 5 "Tsvetotron" factory – Regional Hospital (via Yanka Kupala Street);
 6 "Tsvetotron" factory – Regional Hospital (via Republic Avenue);
 7 "Tsvetotron" factory – SK "Victoria";
 8 Ordzhonikidze – "Tsvetotron" factory.

Fleet 
As at 2011, the Brest trolleybus fleet comprised 80 vehicles, most of them supplied by Belkommunmash, a Belarus-based tram and trolleybus manufacturer.

Depot
The system has one depot.

See also

 List of trolleybus systems
 Trolleybuses in Belarus
 Trolleybuses in former Soviet Union countries

References

External links
 
 

Brest, Belarus
Brest
Brest